Yin Yang fish (also called dead-and-alive fish) is a dish where a live, scaled fish (usually carp) with its head wrapped in ice cubes is oil-fried whole. The fish is then covered in sauce and served on a plate where its head continues to twitch even after its body has been cooked (likely due to remnant electrical impulses after death).

It was invented by a Taiwanese whose restaurant in Chiayi, Taiwan sparked outrage when it began serving the dish in 2007, with a city official and members of the public criticizing the cruelty of the dish.  Following public outcry, the dish was subsequently removed from the menu and banned in Taiwan. A video of a dish in 2009 was condemned by the People for the Ethical Treatment of Animals calling a video showcasing it "disgusting". In 2021 the dish had been adopted in mainland China.

See also
Cruelty to animals
Ikizukuri, live fish served as sashimi in Japanese cuisine
Drunken shrimp, shrimp sometimes eaten alive in Chinese cuisine
Eating live seafood

References

Taiwanese cuisine
Fish dishes
Dishes involving the consumption of live animals
Animal welfare
Deep fried foods